The Ford Falcon (XM) is a mid-size car that was produced by Ford Australia between February 1964 and February 1965. It was the third iteration of the first generation of the Ford Falcon.

Overview
The XM series Falcon range was introduced in February 1964, as a replacement for the XL series Falcon. The XM featured around 1,500 modifications from the XL, including numerous changes to the suspension which now featured stronger ball joints, new front upper wishbones, coil-over shock units and relocated rear spring-hangers. Also new were bigger axle shafts and tougher engine mounts. The vacuum operated windscreen wipers of the XL series were replaced by a two-speed electric motor unit and the seats were stronger with better quality upholstery. Unlike previous Australian Falcons, the XM represented a significant departure from the contemporary US Ford Falcon models in terms of exterior styling.

Both of the engines from the XK and XL Falcons were retained, albeit with a small power increase for both engines; a  Falcon Six inline-six, which produced  and an optional  version of the Falcon Six, which produced . For higher specification models, such as the Deluxe trim, a  version of the Falcon Six was available for the first time (often referred to as the Super Pursuit engine), and produced . The 170 engine was also made the standard engine for the top-spec Futura models.

A two-door hardtop body style was added to the range in July 1964. It was offered in Falcon Deluxe Hardtop and Falcon Futura Hardtop trim levels, with the 170 cubic inch "Pursuit 170" engine as standard equipment and the 200 cubic inch "Super Pursuit" available as an option on both models.

Model range
The Falcon XM passenger car range, released in February 1964, comprised three sedan and three station wagon models, marketed as follows:
 Falcon Sedan
 Falcon Deluxe Sedan
 Falcon Futura Sedan
 Falcon Wagon
 Falcon Deluxe Wagon
 Falcon Squire Wagon
 
The Falcon XM Hardtop range, released in July 1964, comprised two models, marketed as follows:
 Falcon Deluxe Hardtop
 Falcon Futura Hardtop

The Falcon XM commercial vehicle range comprised four models:
 Falcon Standard Utility
 Falcon Deluxe Utility
 Falcon Standard Sedan Delivery
 Falcon Deluxe Sedan Delivery

Production
47,039 examples of the XM series were produced, prior to its replacement by the revised XP Falcon in March 1965.

References

Further reading
 Norm Darwin, The History of Ford in Australia, 1986
 XM Falcon

XM
Cars of Australia
Cars introduced in 1964
Cars discontinued in 1965
XM Falcon
Sedans
Station wagons
Coupé utilities
Vans
Rear-wheel-drive vehicles